Dillion Creek is a stream in Henry County in the U.S. state of Missouri.

Dillion Creek bears the name of a pioneer settler.

See also
List of rivers of Missouri

References

Rivers of Henry County, Missouri
Rivers of Missouri